Blah-Blah-Blah is the seventh studio album by American musician Iggy Pop. Originally released in October 1986, on the label A&M, it remains his most commercially successful album to date. Blah-Blah-Blah appeared after a four-year hiatus for Pop, with David Bowie serving as his prime collaborator. It would be their final collaboration. A successful tour followed the album's release.

Production
The collection included a cover of Johnny O'Keefe's "Wild One" (here titled "Real Wild Child (Wild One)" and three original songs co-written with ex-Sex Pistols guitarist Steve Jones. The remaining tracks were co-written by Bowie, who also produced the album with David Richards but, unlike his previous work with Pop, The Idiot and Lust for Life (both 1977), did not play any instruments, although he did contribute with backing vocals. Bowie biographer David Buckley has reported that Pop "virtually disowned" the record, calling it "a Bowie album in all but name". It has never been specified what tracks on the album, if any, originated during the sessions of Bowie's 1984 album Tonight (that album's co-producer, Hugh Padgham, has recalled that Bowie and Pop collaborated on some songs that Bowie ultimately rejected for inclusion on Tonight).

Release and reception
Described by AllMusic as "the most calculatedly commercial album of Iggy's career", Blah-Blah-Blah was certified gold in Canada (more than 50,000 copies sold). In the U.S. it peaked at No. 75 on Billboard's Top 200 Albums chart. Rolling Stones contemporary review complained of a "nagging homogeneity to side one" but continued that "even at its most familiar, Blah-Blah-Blah is as spiritually outraged and emotionally direct as commercial pop gets these days".

Singles
"Real Wild Child" reached No. 27 on Billboard's Mainstream Rock charts and became Pop's first Top 10 hit in the UK. The song was featured on the soundtrack for the 1988 film Crocodile Dundee II and the 1990 film Pretty Woman, also both Problem Child films and has been the opening theme of the Australian ABC TV music block rage by using snipets along with Johnny O'Keefe's "Wild One" since its launch in 1987. Other singles and videos from the album included "Cry for Love", "Isolation" and "Shades". "Cry for Love", described by Rolling Stone as "a ripping fusion of classic Iggy rage, Bowie cabaret and unexpected romantic vulnerability", made No. 19 on Billboards Hot Dance Music chart and No. 34 on the Mainstream Rock charts.

Track listing

Alternate versions and remixes
"Cry for Love" (Extended dance version) – 6:58 (also listed as Extended remix with a runtime of 7:05 on some releases)
"Cry for Love" (7" edit) – 3:30
"Fire Girl" (Single remix) – 6:54
"Blah-Blah-Blah" (Live; B-side of "Fire Girl" single) – 4:48
"Real Wild Child (Wild One)" (Single mix) – 3:30
"Real Wild Child (Wild One)" (Extended version) – 8:28
"Shades" (Single / LP version) – 5:17 (This is the version from the original vinyl version of the LP. It replaces the regular CD version on the Complete A&M Recordings collection, its first digital issue)
"Baby, It Can't Fall" (Extended remix; B-side of "Shades" single) – 6:10
There are demo versions of some songs in circulation online. "Fire Girl" features David Bowie's backing vocals far more audible than in the album.

Personnel
Credits are adapted from the album's liner notes.
Iggy Pop – vocals
Kevin Armstrong – guitar, backing vocals
Erdal Kızılçay – synthesizer, bass guitar, drums, string arrangements, backing vocals
Steve Jones – guitar solo on "Cry for Love"
David Bowie – backing vocals

Production
David Bowie – producer, mixing
David Richards – producer, engineer, mixing
Nick Egan – art direction, design
Michael Halsband – cover photography

Charts

Certifications

References

External links

1986 albums
Iggy Pop albums
Albums produced by David Bowie
Albums produced by David Richards (record producer)
A&M Records albums